Isabel Freese (born 19 January 1979) is a Norwegian dressage rider. She competed at the 2022 FEI World Championships in Herning as individual and also competed at the 2013 and 2017 European Championships. Freese competed at several World Championships for Young Dressage Horses in which she won a bronze medal in 2018 and 2019.

Freese started riding at the age of six in her hometown Oslo. At the age of 20 she moved to Germany to pursue her equestrian career.

References

External links
 

Living people
1979 births
Norwegian female equestrians
Norwegian dressage riders
German people of Norwegian descent